Mameluco is a Portuguese  word that denotes the first generation child of a European and an Amerindian. It corresponds to the Spanish word mestizo.

In the 17th and 18th centuries, mameluco was also used to refer to organized bands of explorers from Colonial Brazil known as bandeirantes, who roamed the interior of South America departing from São Paulo  near the Atlantic Ocean to the interior of Brazil and Paraguay, invading Guarani settlements in search of slaves and gold.

The word may have become common in Portugal in the Middle Ages, deriving from the Arabic, "Mamluk", "slave", commonly referring to soldiers and rulers of slave origin, especially in Egypt.

See also
Amazonian Jews
Caboclo
Mestiço
Mixed-race Brazilian
Pardo Brazilians

External links

Mamluks
Multiracial affairs in Brazil
People of European descent
Portuguese colonization of the Americas
Portuguese words and phrases